Keith Adams (born 20 June 1950) is a Canadian weightlifter. He competed in the 1972 Summer Olympics.

References

1950 births
Living people
Weightlifters at the 1972 Summer Olympics
Canadian male weightlifters
Olympic weightlifters of Canada
Weightlifters at the 1971 Pan American Games
Pan American Games medalists in weightlifting
Pan American Games bronze medalists for Canada
Medalists at the 1971 Pan American Games
20th-century Canadian people